Sergei Gennadyevich Kormiltsev (born 22 January 1974) is a Russian and Ukrainian football coach and a former player.

Honours
 Ukrainian Premier League winner: 1999, 2000.
 Ukrainian Cup winner: 1999, 2000.

International career
Kormiltsev made his debut for Russia on 18 November 1998 in a friendly against Brazil. After moving to play in Ukraine, he started to play for Ukraine national team and won 15 caps.

He was one of the players and coaches named by Professional Football League on 1 September 2010 as making bets on their own team's results. He was fired by the team shortly after.

References

External links 
  Profile

1974 births
Living people
Sportspeople from Barnaul
Russian footballers
Association football midfielders
Russia international footballers
Ukrainian footballers
Ukraine international footballers
FC Dynamo Barnaul players
FC Elista players
Russian Premier League players
FC Dynamo Kyiv players
FC Torpedo Moscow players
FC Torpedo-2 players
FC Zorya Luhansk players
Ukrainian Premier League players
Dual internationalists (football)
Ukrainian football managers
Naturalized citizens of Ukraine